Frauke Heiligenstadt (born 24 March 1966) is a German politician of the Social Democratic Party who has been serving as a member of the Bundestag since 2021.

Early life and education 
Heiligenstadt was born 1966 in the West German town of Northeim.

Career
Heiligenstadt was a member of the State Parliament of Lower Saxony from 2003 to 2021.

From 2013 to 2017, Heiligenstadt served as State Minister of Education in the government of Minister President Stephan Weil of Lower Saxony. In October 2017, she announced her intention to leave the government after the 2017 elections.

Heiligenstadt was elected to the Bundestag directly in 2021, representing the Goslar – Northeim – Osterode district. In parliament, she has since been serving on the Finance Committee.

Within her parliamentary group, Heiligenstadt belongs to the Parliamentary Left, a left-wing movement.

Other activities
 German United Services Trade Union (ver.di), Member
 Max Planck Institute for Solar System Research, Member of the Board of Trustees (2013–2018)

Personal life 
Heiligenstadt is married and lives in Gillersheim.

References 

Living people
1964 births
Social Democratic Party of Germany politicians
Members of the Bundestag 2021–2025
21st-century German politicians
21st-century German women politicians
Female members of the Bundestag